André Linhares Pereira (born 7 December 1993) is a Brazilian swimmer. He competed in the men's 4 × 200 metre freestyle relay event at the 2016 Summer Olympics. At the 2016 Summer Olympics, he competed in the Men's 4 × 200 metre freestyle relay, where the Brazilian relay finished in 15th place.

References

External links
 

1993 births
Living people
Brazilian male freestyle swimmers
Olympic swimmers of Brazil
Swimmers at the 2016 Summer Olympics
Sportspeople from Rio Grande do Sul
21st-century Brazilian people
20th-century Brazilian people